The brown box crab (Lopholithodes foraminatus) is a king crab that lives from Prince William Sound, Alaska to San Diego, California, at depths of . The box crab gets its name from a pair of round tunnel-like openings that form between the claws and adjacent legs when the animal folds its limbs up against its body. Both claws, and their adjacent legs, have matching half-circle notches in them that line up to create a circle-shaped opening when the limbs are tightly pulled against one another. This tubular round opening is called a foramen. The crab often lies buried in the sediment, and the two foramens in the chelipeds allow water into the gill chamber for respiration. The gill chamber is also sometimes used by the commensal fish Careproctus to hold its eggs.

References

External links

King crabs
Crustaceans of the eastern Pacific Ocean
Crustaceans described in 1859
Taxa named by William Stimpson